Liu E (died 314), courtesy name Lihua (麗華), formally Empress Wuxuan (武宣皇后, literally "the martial and responsible empress") was an empress of the Xiongnu-led Chinese Han Zhao dynasty. She was the third wife of Liu Cong (Emperor Zhaowu).

Life
Liu E was the daughter of one of Liu Cong's honored officials, Liu Yin (劉殷), who was described as someone who was willing to point out Liu Cong's faults, but only doing so in private, thus earning the temperamental and impulsive emperor's respect.  She was initially taken as a concubine by him in 312, along with her sister Liu Ying (劉英) and four of her nieces.  This move was opposed by Liu Cong's brother and crown prince Liu Ai (劉乂), who argued it would be a violation of the prohibition against endogamy.  Liu Cong, however, rationalized the move in that Liu Yin was ethnically Han, while he himself was ethnically Xiongnu, and therefore were not of the same ancestor.

Liu E and her sister Liu Ying were both favored by Liu Cong.  Initially, in 312, Liu Cong wanted to appoint Liu Ying empress to replace Empress Huyan, who had died earlier that year, but at his mother Empress Dowager Zhang's insistence, he appointed another concubine, Zhang Huiguang empress instead.  Liu Ying died soon thereafter.

In 313, Empress Zhang died.  Liu Cong appointed Liu E empress and wanted to build a palace for her.  His minister Chen Yuanda tried to persuade him that it was overly wasteful, and Liu Cong, in anger, ordered Chen's execution.  However, the new empress interceded, and Chen was spared and further promoted.  For the next year, under Empress Liu's and Chen's advice, Liu Cong was said to have corrected his behavior to some extent.

Empress Liu herself was described as intelligent and kind.  However, she died in 314.  It was said that from that point on, Liu Cong's palace would be thoroughly in a confused state, and Liu Cong's own personal behavior appeared to degenerate after this, without her counsel.

References 

314 deaths
Former Zhao empresses
4th-century Chinese women
4th-century Chinese people
Year of birth unknown